Bad Kösen is a spa town on the Saale river in the small  wine-growing region of Saale-Unstrut, Germany. It is a former municipality in the Burgenlandkreis district, in Saxony-Anhalt. Bad Kösen has a population of around 5,300. Since 1 January 2010, it has been a Stadtteil (part) of the town of Naumburg.

Overview
The name of the town was Kösen until 1935.
Bad Kösen, and the nearby Rudelsburg castle with its memorials to the German Student Corps, is the location of the annual convention of the Kösener Senioren-Convents-Verband. In sight of the Rudelsburg is the ruin of the nearby Saaleck Castle.

Bad Kösen was the seat of the former Verwaltungsgemeinschaft ("municipal association") Bad Kösen.

Pforta is an Ortsteil of Bad Kösen.

Gallery

References

External links

 (1911 Encyclopædia Britannica)
 
 Official website of Bad Kösen

 
Naumburg (Saale)
Spa towns in Germany
Former municipalities in Saxony-Anhalt